The Light of Truth Award is a human rights award which is presented nearly annually by the International Campaign for Tibet (ICT), an NGO aiming for the promotion of democracy and human rights for the Tibetan people. The award is presented since 1995 by the fourteenth Dalai Lama, Tenzin Gyatso, to the recipients personally.

The prize consists of a humble Tibetan butter lamp that serves as a symbol of the extraordinary light that every recipient brought to Tibet. In 2005 the ICT received an award itself, the Geuzenpenning, a human rights award from the Netherlands.

The Light of Truth Award is granted to persons and organizations that have publicly contributed substantially to the rise of and battle for human rights and democratic freedoms of the Tibetan people. In 2001, the award was presented to the entire people of India, and accepted for them by president R. Venkataraman.

Recipients
 1995: A. M. Rosenthal
 1996: Richard Gere, Lavinia Currier, and Michael Currier
 1997: Charlie Rose, and Claiborne Pell
 1998: Martin Scorsese, and Melissa Mathison
 1999: Hugh Edward Richardson, and Danielle Mitterrand
 2000: Richard C. Blum
 2001: The people of India, taken delivery of by R. Venkataraman
 2002: Heinrich Harrer, and Petra Kelly
 2003: Benjamin A. Gilman, Michele Bohana, and Robert Thurman
 2004: Otto Graf Lambsdorff, Irmtraut Wäger, and Václav Havel
 2005: Elie Wiesel, Carl Gershman, and Lowell Thomas, Jr.
 2006: Hergé Foundation, and Desmond Tutu
 2009: Julia Taft, and Wang Lixiong
 2011: George Patterson
 2013: Robert Ford, International Commission of Jurists, Sigrid Joss-Arnd, Christian Schwarz-Schilling, Theo van Boven

References 

ICT, Recipients and description
ICT, Light of Truth award to Patterson, March 25, 2011
Geuzenverzet, recipients of de Geuzenpenning 
Canada Tibet Committee,  4. Light of Truth award to India, December 17, 2002

Tibet
Human rights awards